Ervan F. "Bud" Coleman (July 7, 1921 – May 26, 1967) was an American guitar and mandolin player, member of Baja Marimba Band, worked with Herb Alpert & The Tijuana Brass, and who wrote the hit track, "Tijuana Taxi".

On the liner notes of Herb Alpert's "Definitive Hits" for the song "Tijuana Taxi" Herb Alpert wrote: "(Tijuana Taxi) was written by Bud Coleman who also played guitar and mandolin on many Tijuana Brass recordings until his untimely death. Bud wrote some great songs for us, but this one had a fabulous visual image of a Tijuana Taxi moving off a road and taking short cuts through the fields of Tijuana, Mexico."

"Tijuana Taxi" was originally released on the hit album, Going Places (1965).

Death
He died in 1967 from surgical complications. The song "Bud" is a tribute song for Coleman. It was released on Herb Alpert And The Tijuana Brass 1967 album, Herb Alpert's Ninth. Coleman's widow, Eleanor, was given co-writing credits for this song. Julius Wechter's Baja Marimba Band also recorded a tribute song entitled "For Bud" on their 1968 album Do You Know The Way To San Jose. His son, Gregory was an accomplished guitarist and musician.

Discography

With Irene Kral
Wonderful Life (Mainstream, 1965)
With Nancy Sinatra
Boots (Reprise, 1966)
With The T-Bones

 No Matter What Shape (Your Stomach's In) (Liberty Records, 1966)

References

External links

1921 births
1967 deaths
American mandolinists
Place of birth missing
Place of death missing
20th-century American guitarists
American male guitarists
20th-century American male musicians
The T-Bones members